This is a list of Czech regions by GDP and GDP per capita by The Czech Statistical Office.  All exchange rates are based on the average for 2021. (USDCZK - 21.72)

List of Regions by GDP 
Regions by GDP in 2021 according to data by the Czech Statistical Office.

List of Regions by GDP per capita 
Regions by GDP per capita in 2021 according to data by the Czech Statistical Office.

References 

Gross state product
Regions by GDP
 
Ranked lists of country subdivisions
Czechia